Clytra ovata is a species of leaf beetle from the subfamily of Cryptocephalinae. It can be found on Cyprus and in southern Turkey and the Middle East.

References

Beetles described in 1848
Beetles of Asia
Clytrini